George Douglas, 13th Earl of Morton (1662 – 4 January 1738), of St Ola, Orkney, styled The Honourable George Douglas between 1681 and 1730, was a Scottish nobleman, soldier and politician who sat in the House of Commons from 1708 until he succeeded to a peerage in 1730.

Background
Douglas was a younger son of James Douglas, 10th Earl of Morton, and Anne, daughter of Sir James Hay, 1st Baronet.

He became a professional soldier in various Scottish regiments but was made redundant in 1707 following the Union of England and Scotland.

Political career
Douglas was elected as Member of Parliament for Lanark Burghs, also known as Linlithgow Burgs, in 1708 and was returned there unopposed in 1710. In 1713 he was elected MP for Orkney and Shetland. He was returned as MP for  Lanark Burgs in 1715 when he was unopposed, but in the 1722 general election he was defeated there in a contest. However at the same general election he was also returned unopposed at Orkney where he was returned again in 1727.  He surrendered his seat in 1730 when he succeeded his elder brother in the earldom and was elected a Scottish Representative Peer, which he remained until his death.
He also served as Vice-Admiral of Scotland from 1733 to 1738.

Family
Lord Morton married Frances Adderley. He died in January 1738 and was succeeded in his titles by his son, James.

References

External link

1662 births
1738 deaths
Earls of Morton
Scottish soldiers
Scottish representative peers
Members of the Parliament of Great Britain for Scottish constituencies
Politics of South Lanarkshire
Politics of Orkney
Politics of Shetland
17th-century Scottish people
18th-century Scottish people
British MPs 1708–1710
British MPs 1710–1713
British MPs 1713–1715
British MPs 1715–1722
British MPs 1722–1727
British MPs 1727–1734